The Pasadena Bowl, known as the Junior Rose Bowl from 1946 to 1966 and again in 1976 and 1977, was a college football bowl game. 

Between 1946 and 1966 and again in 1976 and 1977, the game pitted the California Junior College football champions against the National Junior College Athletic Association (NJCAA) football teams (not always the champion) for the national championship. It was organized by the Pasadena Junior Chamber of Commerce. 

The Junior Rose Bowl became the Pasadena Bowl from 1967 to 1971. It was billed as the Junior Rose Bowl the first two years, but now featured teams from the National Collegiate Athletic Association's College and University Divisions.  The bowl featured the champion of the Pacific Coast Athletic Association (PCAA) from 1969 to 1970 and the champion of the Missouri Valley Conference in 1971.

Game results

See also
 List of college bowl games
 Rose Bowl Game

References

Defunct college football bowls
American football in California
Sports competitions in Pasadena, California